
Year 797 (DCCXCVII) was a common year starting on Sunday (link will display the full calendar) of the Julian calendar. The denomination 797 for this year has been used since the early medieval period, when the Anno Domini calendar era became the prevalent method in Europe for naming years.

Events 
 By place 
 Byzantine Empire 
 April 19 – Empress Irene organizes a conspiracy against her son Constantine VI. He is captured and blinded; Irene exiles him to Principo, where he dies shortly thereafter of his wounds. Irene begins a 5-year reign, and calls herself basileus ("emperor") of the Byzantine Empire. 

 Europe 
 King Charlemagne issues the Capitulare Saxonicum, making Westphalian, Angrian and Eastphalian Saxons equal to other peoples in the Frankish Kingdom. The Nordalbian Saxons revolt; a Frankish fleet is sent to the North Sea coast of Germany. It lands in Hadeln, a marshy coastal region between the Weser and Elbe estuaries, near modern-day Cuxhaven. Charlemagne invades northern Saxony, and again accepts the submission of the Saxons.

 Britain 
 Battle of Rhuddlan: Welsh forces, including those of Powys and Dyfed, clash with Mercians. King Coenwulf tries to re-assert his domination of northeast Wales. King Caradog ap Meirion of Gwynedd is killed during the fighting (approximate date).

Births 
 Bernard of Italy, king of the Lombards (d. 818)
 Ignatius I, patriarch of Constantinople (or 798)
 Judith of Bavaria, Frankish empress (or 805)
 Meinrad of Einsiedeln, German hermit (d. 861)
 Pepin I of Aquitaine, king of Aquitaine (d. 838)
 Shinshō, Japanese Buddhist monk (d. 873)

Deaths 
 February 6 – Donnchad Midi, High King of Ireland
 Æthelberht of Whithorn, Anglo-Saxon bishop
 Al-Hasan ibn Qahtaba, Muslim military leader
 Bermudo I, king of Asturias (approximate date)
 Caradog ap Meirion, king of Gwynedd (approximate date)
 Constantine VI, emperor of the Byzantine Empire (b. 771)
 Cummascach mac Fogartaig, king of South Brega
 Guan Bo, chancellor of the Tang Dynasty (b. 719)
 Muireadhach mac Olcobhar, Anglo-Saxon abbot

References